The Koret Jewish Book Award is an annual award that recognizes "recently published books on any aspect of Jewish life in the categories of biography/autobiography and literary studies, fiction, history and philosophy/thought published in, or translated into, English." The award was established in 1998 by the Koret Foundation, in cooperation with the National Foundation for Jewish Culture, to increase awareness of the best new Jewish books and their authors. 

Professor Samuel Zipperstein of Stanford University oversaw the awards from their creation until 2005, when the Koret Foundation decided to increase public interest in the awards by honoring books that were less academic and more accessible to readers. Jewish Family & Life!, a non-profit organization, was selected to manage the awards. Its CEO, Rabbi Yosef Abramowitz, stated that he hoped to transform the awards into something akin to Oprah's Book Club.  The History category and the Biography, Autobiography or Literary Study category were eliminated and replaced with a new category, Jewish Life & Living.

The Koret Jewish Book Award is one of the highest honors for authors of works on Jewish subjects.

Winners

Fiction

Jewish Life and Living

History (discontinued)

Philosophy and Thought

Biography, Autobiography or Literary Study (discontinued)

Children's Literature

Special Awards

German writer W. G. Sebald received a special Koret award in 2002 for his contributions to literature. Steven J. Zipperstein, the director of the Korets, cited Sebald's novel Austerlitz as a particularly impressive work. Sebald died several months before the awards ceremony.

In 2006, Jonathan Safran Foer's novel Everything is Illuminated received JBooks.com's People's Choice award for the best Jewish work of fiction of the previous decade, as determined by 1,500 voters in an online contest.

References

External links
Koret Jewish Book Award

American literary awards
Awards established in 1998
Jewish literary awards
Jewish American literature
Literary awards honoring minority groups